Savannah is a feminine given name, taken from either the name of the city of Savannah, Georgia, or savanna, a large, grassy plain ecosystem.

The name was the 39th  most popular name for baby girls born in the United States in 2014. It was also among the top hundred names for girls in Canada and Australia in 2006.

The name has been in use in the United States since at least the late 19th century, according to Social Security Administration records.

People with the name
 Savanna Cordes (born 1994), South African cricketer
 Savanna Samson (born 1967), American former pornographic actress
 Savanna Shaw (born 2004), American singer
 Savannah (1970-1994), American pornographic actress
 Savannah Broadus (born 2002), American tennis player
 Savannah Buffett (born 1979), American radio personality
 Savannah Burton, Canadian athlete
 Savannah Churchill (1920-1974), American singer
 Savannah Clarke (born 2003), Australian singer, dancer, actress, model, and composer
 Savannah Conley (born 1997), American singer-songwriter
 Savannah Cristina (born 1997), American singer-songwriter
 Savannah Dooley (born 1985), American screenwriter and television producer
 Savannah Fitzpatrick (born 1995), Australian field hockey player
 Savannah Graybill (born 1988), American skeleton racer
 Savannah Guthrie (born 1971), Australian-born American journalist and attorney
 Savannah Harmon (born 1995), American ice hockey player
 Savannah Haske (born 1977), American television- and film actress and writer
 Savannah Jack (1948-2012), American professional wrestler
 Savannah Johnson Speak (1868-1929), English mining engineer and metallurgist
 Savannah Jordan (born 1995), American retired soccer player
 Savannah King (born 1992), Canadian freestyle swimmer
 Savannah Knoop (born 1981), American artist, writer, and filmmaker
 Savannah Lane (born 1995), American beauty pageant titleholder
 Savannah Levin (born 1995), American soccer player
 Savannah Maddox (born 1987), American politician
 Savannah Marshall (born 1991), British professional boxer
 Savannah McCarthy (born 1997), Irish footballer
 Savannah McCaskill (born 1996), American soccer player
 Savannah Miller (born 1978), American-British fashion designer
 Savannah Outen (born 1992), American singer
 Savannah Robinson (born 1998), American singer
 Savannah Sanitoa (born 1987), American Samoan sprinter
 Savannah Schroll Guz (born 1974), American mixed-media artist, art critic, and fiction writer
 Savannah Siew (born 1996), Singaporean sailor
 Savannah Smith (born 1992), American basketball player
 Savannah Smith Boucher (born 1943), American actress
 Savannah Stehlin (born 1996), American actress
 Savannah Stevenson (born 1983), English singer and actress
 Savannah Vinsant (born 1993), American trampoline gymnast
 Savannah Welch (born 1984), American actress and musician
 Savannah Wise, American actress, singer, and dancer

Notes

Feminine given names
English given names
Given names